Eagle Junction railway station is located on the North Coast line in Queensland, Australia. It is one of two railway stations serving the Brisbane suburb of Clayfield, the other being Clayfield railway station. North of the station, the Pinkenba and Airport lines branch off.

History
The station opened as Eagle Farm Junction, being renamed Eagle Junction in January 1888. The original name reflects that this station was the junction at which the line to Eagle Farm branched off.

The station was rebuilt in 1963. In 2011, the station was upgraded.

Services
Eagle Junction station is served by Airport, Caboolture, Doomben, Redcliffe Peninsula, Shorncliffe and Sunshine Coast line services.

Services by platform

References

External links

Eagle Junction station Queensland Rail
Eagle Junction station Queensland's Railways on the Internet
[ Eagle Junction station] TransLink travel information

Railway stations in Brisbane
North Coast railway line, Queensland